The 2S12 "Sani" ("sleigh") (GRAU index 2S12) is a 120 mm heavy mortar system used by the Russian Army and other former Soviet states. First fielded in 1981, the 2S12 is a continued development on the towed mortars first used in World War II.

Design

2S12 is in fact the designator for the combination of the 2B11 "Sani"  heavy mortar with its transport vehicle 2F510, a GAZ-66-15 4×4 truck. The 2B11 weighs nearly 200 kg (500 lb) when fully assembled, and thus must be mounted to the 2×1 wheeled chassis 2L81 and towed to the emplacement site by the truck. The GAZ-66 prime mover also transports the ammo load: 24  crates of 120mm HE mortar bombs, 2 bombs per crate, for a total of 48 available rounds.

Once on site, it is unloaded from the transport chassis and manually emplaced by the crew of 5. It is the largest caliber indirect artillery employed at the battalion level.

There is also an improved model, the 2B11M, that can fire the laser-guided round "Gran" with a range of 7,500 m. 2S12A and 2S12B improved models are in service now. 2S12A got a new "Ural" family transport vehicle with high power diesel engine and electric hoist for loading the mortar and a new base plate with a hinge that allows for pointing horizontally without turning the heavy support.

Operators

Current operators
 
 
 : 61
 
 : 14
 
 : 6
 : more than 1,700 , including 1,000 in store
 
 : 214
 : 19
 : 48

Former operators

See also
 List of heavy mortars
 M120 120 mm mortar 120 mm mortar
 2B11 Sani 120 mm mortar
 Cardom 120 mm recoil mortar system
 Soltam K6 120 mm mortar
 Soltam M-65 120 mm mortar
 120 KRH 92 120 mm mortar
 120mm M2 RAIADO 120 mm mortar
 Mortier 120mm Rayé Tracté Modèle F1 120 mm mortar

References

Sources

External links
 2S12 MZ-304 "Highlander" 120-mm mortar

Mortars of the Soviet Union
Infantry mortars
Artillery of Russia
Uraltransmash products
120mm mortars
Military equipment introduced in the 1980s